Mercedes Lyn Bauzá (born Mercedes Lyn Fisher) is an American-born Puerto Rican footballer who plays as a forward for Puerto Rico Sol and the Puerto Rico women's national team. Named Queen of the Match by Budweiser in both of her appearances.

Early life
Bauzá was raised in Mebane, North Carolina and attended Eastern Alamance High School.

Club career

Puerto Rico Sol FC
On 17 October 2021, Bauzá made her debut for Puerto Rico Sol FC. On 31 October, she scored her first senior hat-trick in a 9–1 victory over Metropolitan FA.

International career
Bauzá qualified to play for Puerto Rico through her paternal grandfather. She was capped for Las Boricuas at senior level during the 2018 CONCACAF Women's Championship qualification.

References

1997 births
Living people
Women's association football forwards
Puerto Rican women's footballers
Puerto Rico women's international footballers
American women's soccer players
Soccer players from North Carolina
People from Mebane, North Carolina
American sportspeople of Puerto Rican descent
College women's soccer players in the United States
Greensboro College alumni